Ella Aiko Anderson (born March 26, 2005) is an American actress. She began her career as a child actress, starring as Piper Hart on the Nickelodeon television series Henry Danger, and is also known for playing the role of Rachel Rawlings in the 2016 comedy adventure film The Boss.

Career 
Anderson began as a child actress, acting since she was five years old. She played Hazel in Disney Channel's A.N.T. Farm in 2011. She has also appeared in one episode of Raising Hope, as a little girl who gets a needle stuck in her hand. She made further appearances on Disney shows in 2013, being in Dog with a Blog as Darcy Stewart and Liv and Maddie as Jenny Keene. In 2014, she played Mitzy in Nickelodeon's A Fairly Odd Summer. Anderson has portrayed Piper Hart in the Nickelodeon television series Henry Danger from 2014-2020, and appeared in the film Unfinished Business. She has played Rachel Rawlings in The Boss, and Vicky in Mother's Day, both films from 2016, and Jeanette Walls at age 11 opposite Brie Larson in the 2017 film The Glass Castle.

In recent years, Anderson has started a YouTube channel along with a music career, releasing her first three singles in 2020 and 2021.

Filmography

Awards and nominations

References

External links 
 

2005 births
21st-century American actresses
American child actresses
American film actresses
American television actresses
Living people
Place of birth missing (living people)